Foto (Bafoto) is a Bantu language of the Democratic Republic of Congo. Guthrie classified it close to Mongo. However, Mongo and its closest relatives were split between the Bangi–Ntomba and Soko–Kele branches of Bantu in Nurse (2003), and it is not clear where Foto belongs.

References

Bangi-Ntomba languages